The 37th Annual Grammy Awards were presented on March 1, 1995, at Shrine Auditorium, Los Angeles. They recognized accomplishments by musicians from the previous year. Bruce Springsteen was the night's biggest winner with 4 awards, including Song of the Year while opening the show with his Grammy nominated hit.

Performances

Presenters

Award winners

General
Record of the Year
 "All I Wanna Do" – Sheryl Crow
 Bill Bottrell, producer
 "Streets of Philadelphia" – Bruce Springsteen
 Chuck Plotkin, Bruce Springsteen, producers
 "Love Sneakin' Up On You" – Bonnie Raitt
 Bonnie Raitt, Don Was, producers
 "I'll Make Love to You" – Boyz II Men
 Babyface, producer
 "He Thinks He'll Keep Her – Mary Chapin Carpenter
 Mary Chapin Carpenter, John Jennings, producers

Album of the Year
 MTV Unplugged – Tony Bennett
 David Kahne, producer
 The Three Tenors in Concert 1994 – José Carreras, Plácido Domingo, Luciano Pavarotti, Zubin Mehta
 Tibor Rudas, producer
 Seal – Seal
 Trevor Horn, producer
 Longing in Their Hearts – Bonnie Raitt
 Bonnie Raitt, Don Was, producers
 From the Cradle – Eric Clapton
 Eric Clapton, Russ Titelman, producers

Song of the Year
 "Streets of Philadelphia"
 Bruce Springsteen, songwriter (Springsteen)
 I Swear
 Gary Baker, Frank J. Myers, songwriters (All-4-One, and separately John Michael Montgomery)
 Circle of Life
 Elton John, Tim Rice, songwriters (John)
 Can You Feel the Love Tonight
 Elton John, Tim Rice, songwriters (John)
 All I Wanna Do
 David Baerwald, Bill Bottrell, Wyn Cooper, Sheryl Crow, Kevin Gilbert, songwriters (Crowe)

Best New Artist
Sheryl Crow
 Green Day
 Crash Test Dummies
 Counting Crows
 Ace of Base

Alternative
Best Alternative Music Performance
Green Day for Dookie

Blues
Best Traditional Blues Album
Eric Clapton for From the Cradle
Best Contemporary Blues Album
Pops Staples for Father Father

Children's
Best Musical Album for Children
Mark Mancina, Jay Rifkin, Chris Thomas, Hans Zimmer (producers) & various artists for The Lion King - Original Motion Picture Soundtrack
Best Spoken Word Album for Children
Ted Kryczko, Randy Thornton (producers) & Robert Guillaume for The Lion King Read-Along

Classical
Best Orchestral Performance
Pierre Boulez (conductor) & the Chicago Symphony Orchestra for Bartók: Concerto for Orchestra; Four Orchestral Pieces, Op. 12
Best Classical Vocal Performance
Cecilia Bartoli for The Impatient Lover - Italian Songs by Beethoven, Schubert, Mozart 
Best Opera Recording
Martin Sauer (producer), Kent Nagano (conductor), Kenn Chester, Jerry Hadley, Samuel Ramey, Cheryl Studer, & the Orchestre of Opera De Lyon & Chorus for Floyd: Susannah
Best Choral Performance
John Eliot Gardiner (choir director), the Monteverdi Choir & the Orchestre Révolutionnaire et Romantique for Berlioz: Messe Solennelle
Best Instrumental Soloist Performance (with orchestra)
David Zinman (conductor), Yo-Yo Ma & the Baltimore Symphony Orchestra for The New York Album - Works of Albert, Bartók & Bloch
Best Instrumental Soloist Performance Without Orchestra
Emanuel Ax for Haydn: Piano Sonatas, Nos. 32, 47, 53, 59
Best Chamber Music Performance
Daniel Barenboim, Dale Clevenger, Larry Combs, Daniele Damiano, Hansjörg Schellenberger & the Berlin Philharmonic for Beethoven/Mozart: Quintets (Chicago-Berlin)
Best Classical Contemporary Composition
Stephen Albert (composer), David Zinman (conductor) & Yo-Yo Ma for Albert: Cello Concerto
Best Classical Album
Karl-August Naegler (producer), Pierre Boulez (conductor) & the Chicago Symphony Orchestra for Bartók: Concerto for Orchestra; Four Orchestral Pieces, Op. 12

Comedy
From 1994 through 2003, see "Best Spoken Comedy Album" under the "Spoken Word" field, below.

Composing and arranging
Best Instrumental Composition
Michael Brecker (composer) for "African Skies"
Best Song Written Specifically for a Motion Picture or for Television
Bruce Springsteen (composer) for Streets of Philadelphia
Best Instrumental Composition Written for a Motion Picture or for Television
John Williams (composer) for Schindler's List
Best Instrumental Arrangement
Dave Grusin (arranger) for "Three Cowboy Songs"
Best Instrumental Arrangement with Accompanying Vocals
Hans Zimmer & Lebo Morake (arrangers) for "Circle of Life" performed by Carmen Twillie

Country
Best Female Country Vocal Performance
Mary Chapin Carpenter for "Shut Up and Kiss Me"
Best Male Country Vocal Performance
Vince Gill for "When Love Finds You"
Best Country Performance by a Duo or Group with Vocal
Asleep at the Wheel & Lyle Lovett for "Blues for Dixie"
Best Country Vocal Collaboration
Aaron Neville & Trisha Yearwood for "I Fall to Pieces"
Best Country Instrumental Performance
Chet Atkins for "Young Thing"
Best Country Song
Gary Baker & Frank J. Myers for "I Swear" performed by John Michael Montgomery
Best Country Album
Mary Chapin Carpenter for Stones in the Road
Best Bluegrass Album
Jerry Douglas & Tut Taylor (producers) for The Great Dobro Sessions performed by various artists

Folk
Best Traditional Folk Album
Bob Dylan for World Gone Wrong
Best Contemporary Folk Album
Johnny Cash for American Recordings

Gospel
Best Pop/Contemporary Gospel Album
Andrae Crouch for Mercy
Best Rock Gospel Album
Petra for Wake-Up Call
Best Traditional Soul Gospel Album
Albertina Walker for Songs of the Church - Live in Memphis
Best Contemporary Soul Gospel Album
Take 6 for Join the Band
Best Southern Gospel, Country Gospel or Bluegrass Gospel Album
Alison Krauss & The Cox Family for I Know Who Holds Tomorrow
Best Gospel Album by a Choir or Chorus
Milton Brunson (choir director) for Through God's Eyes performed by the Thompson Community Singers
Hezekiah Walker (choir director) for Live in Atlanta at Morehouse College performed by the Love Fellowship Crusade Choir

Historical
Best Historical Album
Michael Lang (producer) for The Complete Ella Fitzgerald Song Books on Verve

Jazz
Best Jazz Instrumental Solo
Benny Carter for "Prelude to a Kiss"
Best Jazz Instrumental Performance, Individual or Group
Ron Carter, Herbie Hancock, Wallace Roney, Wayne Shorter & Tony Williams for A Tribute to Miles
Best Large Jazz Ensemble Performance
McCoy Tyner for "Journey"
Best Jazz Vocal Performance
Etta James for Mystery Lady: Songs of Billie Holiday
Best Contemporary Jazz Performance
The Brecker Brothers for Out of the Loop
Best Latin Jazz Performance
Arturo Sandoval for Danzón (Dance On)

Latin
Best Latin Pop Performance
Luis Miguel for Segundo Romance
Best Tropical Latin Performance
Cachao for Master Sessions Volume 1
Best Mexican-American Performance
Vikki Carr for Recuerdo a Javier Solis

Musical show
Best Musical Show Album
Phil Ramone (producer), Stephen Sondheim (composer & lyricist) & the original cast for Passion

Music video
Best Music Video, Short Form
Ceán Chaffin (video producer), David Fincher (video director) & The Rolling Stones for "Love is Strong"
Best Music Video, Long Form
Ned O'Hanlon, Rocky Oldham (video producers), David Mallet (video director) & U2 for Zoo TV: Live from Sydney

New Age
Best New Age Album
Paul Winter for Prayer for the Wild Things

Packaging and notes
Best Recording Package
Buddy Jackson (art director) for Tribute to the Music of Bob Wills & the Texas Playboys performed by Asleep at the Wheel
Best Recording Package - Boxed
Chris Thompson (art director) for The Complete Ella Fitzgerald Songbooks performed by Ella Fitzgerald
Best Album Notes
Dan Morgenstern & Loren Schoenberg (notes writers) for Louis Armstrong - Portrait of The Artist as a Young Man 1923-1934 performed by Louis Armstrong

Polka
Best Polka Album
Walter Ostanek for Music and Friends performed by the Walter Ostanek Band

Pop
Best Female Pop Vocal Performance
Sheryl Crow for "All I Wanna Do"
Best Male Pop Vocal Performance
Elton John for "Can You Feel The Love Tonight"
Best Pop Performance by a Duo or Group with Vocals
All-4-One for "I Swear"
Best Pop Vocal Collaboration
Al Green & Lyle Lovett for "Funny How Time Slips Away"
Best Pop Instrumental Performance
Booker T. & the M.G.'s for "Cruisin'"
Best Pop Album
Bonnie Raitt for Longing in Their Hearts

Production and engineering
Best Engineered Album, Non-Classical
Ed Cherney (engineer) for Longing in Their Hearts, performed by Bonnie Raitt

Best Engineered Album, Classical
William Hoekstra (engineer) for Copland: Music For Films (The Red Pony, Our Town, Etc.)

Producer of the Year
Don Was

Classical Producer of the Year
Andrew Cornall

R&B
Best Female R&B Vocal Performance
Toni Braxton for "Breathe Again"
Best Male R&B Vocal Performance
Babyface for "When Can I See You"
Best R&B Performance by a Duo or Group with Vocal
Boyz II Men for "I'll Make Love to You"
Best Rhythm & Blues Song
Babyface (songwriter) for "I'll Make Love to You" performed by Boyz II Men
Best R&B Album
Boyz II Men for II

Rap
 Best Rap Solo Performance
 "U.N.I.T.Y." – Queen Latifah
 "Fantastic Voyage" – Coolio
 "Flava in Ya Ear" – Craig Mack
 "Gin and Juice" – Snoop Doggy Dogg
 "This D.J." – Warren G

 Best Rap Performance by a Duo or Group
 "None of Your Business" – Salt-N-Pepa
 "Ease My Mind" – Arrested Development
 "I Ain't Goin' Out Like That" – Cypress Hill
 "Nuttin' But Love" – Heavy D & the Boyz
 "Regulate" – Warren G featuring Nate Dogg

Reggae
Best Reggae Album
Bunny Wailer for Crucial! Roots Classics

Rock
Best Female Rock Vocal Performance
Melissa Etheridge for "Come To My Window"
Best Male Rock Vocal Performance
Bruce Springsteen for "Streets Of Philadelphia"
Best Rock Performance by a Duo or Group with Vocal
Aerosmith for "Crazy"
Best Rock Instrumental Performance
Pink Floyd for "Marooned"
Best Hard Rock Performance
Soundgarden for "Black Hole Sun"
Best Metal Performance
Soundgarden for "Spoonman"
Best Rock Song
Bruce Springsteen  for "Streets of Philadelphia"
Best Rock Album
The Rolling Stones (artist) Don Was (producer) for "Voodoo Lounge"

Spoken Word
Best Spoken Word or Non-Musical Album
Henry Rollins for Get In The Van - On The Road With Black Flag
Best Spoken Comedy Album
Sam Kinison for Live From Hell

Traditional Pop
Best Traditional Pop Vocal Performance
Tony Bennett for MTV Unplugged: Tony Bennett

World
Best World Music Album
Ry Cooder & Ali Farka Touré for Talking Timbuktu

Special merit awards

MusiCares Person of the Year
Tony Bennett

Television ratings
17.3 million viewers watched the 1995 Grammy Awards.

Notes

 037
1995 in California
1995 music awards
1995 in Los Angeles
1995 in American music
March 1995 events in the United States
Grammy